Henderson-Massey Local Board is one of the 21 local boards of the Auckland Council, and is overseen by the council's Waitākere Ward and Whau Ward councillors.

The board's administrative area includes the suburbs of West Harbour, Massey, Rānui, Glendene, Lincoln, Henderson South, Sunnyvale, Te Atatū Peninsula, and Te Atatū South, and covers from the foothills of the Waitākere Ranges in the west and the Waitematā Harbour in the east.

The board is governed by eight board members elected at-large. The inaugural members were elected in the nationwide 2010 local elections, coinciding with the introduction of the Auckland Council.

Demographics

Henderson-Massey Local Board Area had a population of 118,422 at the 2018 New Zealand census, an increase of 10,737 people (10.0%) since the 2013 census, and an increase of 19,632 people (19.9%) since the 2006 census. There were 35,439 households, comprising 58,425 males and 59,997 females, giving a sex ratio of 0.97 males per female. The median age was 33.1 years (compared with 37.4 years nationally), with 26,673 people (22.5%) aged under 15 years, 26,241 (22.2%) aged 15 to 29, 53,172 (44.9%) aged 30 to 64, and 12,333 (10.4%) aged 65 or older.

Ethnicities were 48.7% European/Pākehā, 17.2% Māori, 20.9% Pacific peoples, 27.5% Asian, and 3.8% other ethnicities. People may identify with more than one ethnicity.

The percentage of people born overseas was 37.5, compared with 27.1% nationally.

Although some people chose not to answer the census's question about religious affiliation, 40.9% had no religion, 40.5% were Christian, 1.2% had Māori religious beliefs, 4.9% were Hindu, 2.8% were Muslim, 1.7% were Buddhist and 2.0% had other religions.

Of those at least 15 years old, 19,776 (21.6%) people had a bachelor's or higher degree, and 15,879 (17.3%) people had no formal qualifications. The median income was $31,400, compared with $31,800 nationally. 13,110 people (14.3%) earned over $70,000 compared to 17.2% nationally. The employment status of those at least 15 was that 47,598 (51.9%) people were employed full-time, 11,367 (12.4%) were part-time, and 4,629 (5.0%) were unemployed.

2016-19 term
Shane Henderson (Chair), Labour 
Peter Chan (Deputy Chair), Independent 
Paula Bold-Wilson, Labour
Brenda Brady, Independent
Warren Flaunty, Independent 
Will Flavell, Labour
Matt Grey, Labour 
Vanessa Neeson, Independent

2019-22 term
Chris Carter (Chair) (Labour)
Will Flavell (Labour)
Brooke Loader (Labour)
Brenda Brady (Independent)
Peter Chan (Independent)
Ingrid Papau (Independent)
Matt Grey (Independent)
Vanessa Neeson (Independent)

2022-25 term
Chris Carter (Chair) (Labour)
Will Flavell (Labour)
Brooke Loader (Labour)
Brenda Brady (Independent)
Peter Chan (Independent)
Ingrid Papau (Independent)
Dan Collins (Labour)
Oscar Knightly (Labour)

References

Auckland Council
Local boards of the Auckland Region
Henderson-Massey Local Board Area
West Auckland, New Zealand